This is a list of Estonian television related events from 2010.

Events
12 March - Malcolm Lincoln & Manpower 4 are selected to represent Estonia at the 2010 Eurovision Song Contest with their song "Siren". They are selected to be the sixteenth Estonian Eurovision entry during Eesti Laul held at the Nokia Concert Hall in Tallinn.

Debuts

Television shows

1990s
Õnne 13 (1993–present)

2000s
Eesti otsib superstaari (2007–present)

Ending this year

Births

Deaths

See also
2010 in Estonia